The 2016–17 AEK B.C. season was AEK's 60th season in the top-tier level Greek Basket League. AEK played in three different competitions during that season.

Transfers 2016–17

Players In

|}

Total spending:  €25,000+

Players Out

|}

Total income:  €0

Total expenditure:  €25,000+

Preseason and friendlies

Competitions

Overall

Overview

Greek League

League table

Results summary

Results by round

Regular season

Results overview

Quarterfinals

Semifinals

Third Place

Greek Cup

 Quarterfinals

 Semifinals

Champions League

Regular season - Group E

Results summary

Results by round

Regular season

Results overview

Play-offs qualifiers

Round of 16

References

2016-17
2016–17 in Greek basketball by club